The following is a timeline of the history of the city of Trento in the Trentino-South Tyrol region of Italy.

Prior to 19th century

 49 BCE – Trento granted Roman citizenship.
 2nd–4th C. CE – Roman Catholic diocese of Trento established.
 387 CE – Vigilius of Trent becomes bishop.
 5th C. – Ostrogoths in power.
 569 – Trento becomes "seat of the Lombard dukes."
 774 - Franks in power.
 1027 – Bishopric of Trent established.
 1145 - Trento Cathedral consecrated.
 1207 – Federico Wanga becomes bishop.
 1212 – Cathedral of San Vigilio construction begins.
 1250 – Buonconsiglio Castle construction begins.
 1475 – Printing press in operation.
 1487 - Venetian attacks ended.
 16th C. - Palazzo delle Albere built. 
 1514
 Bernardo Clesio becomes bishop.
 Santa Maria Maggiore church construction begins.
 1515 - Palazzo Salvadori building begins.
 1545 – Religious Council of Trent begins.
 1563 – Council of Trent ends.
 1602 – Palazzo Galasso built.
 1761 – Accademia Trentina active.(it)
 1743 - Trento Cathedral building completed. 
 1768 –  installed.
 1795 – Società Filarmonica di Trento founded.(it)

19th century
 1803 – Trento becomes part of Austria.
 1810 – Trento becomes seat of the Department of Alto Adige of the Napoleonic Kingdom of Italy.
 1814 – Trento becomes part of the Austrian Habsburg Empire again.
 1819 –  opens.
 1827 –  (cemetery) established.
 1846 –  (museum) opens.
 1848 – .
 1856 –  (library) established.
 1857 – Population: 14,347.
 1859 – Brenner Railway (Verona-Trento) begins operating & Trento railway station opens.
 1872 – Società degli Alpinisti Tridentini (hiking club) founded.
 1880 – Population: 19,585.
 1896 –  erected.
 1900 – Population: 24,868.

20th century

 1909 – Trento–Malè–Marilleva railway begins operating.
 1910
 Trento–Venice railway in operation.
 Population: 30,049.
 1918 – Trento becomes part of Italy.
 1919 – Società per gli Studî Trentini founded.
 1921 – A.C. Trento S.C.S.D. (football club) formed.
 1922 – Stadio Briamasco (stadium) opens.
 1923 –  (administrative region) established.
 1925 –  begins operating.
 1931 – Population: 38,176.
 1935 –  built on nearby .
 1936 – Trento railway station rebuilt.
 1938 – Giardino Botanico Alpino alle Viotte di Monte Bondone (garden) established near Trento.
 1943 – 2 September:  by Allied forces during World War II.
 1945 – l'Adige newspaper begins publication.
 1947 - Trentino-Alto Adige/Südtirol autonomous region established.
 1952 -  begins.
 1962 - Istituto universitario superiore di Scienze Sociali established.
 1966 - Student unrest.
 1986 - Accademia degli Accesi active.(it)
 1988 - Trentino Tyrolean Autonomist Party formed.
 1990 - Lorenzo Dellai becomes mayor.
 1998 -  becomes mayor.

21st century

 2008
 September: Alessandro Andreatta becomes mayor.
 26 October: Trentino-Alto Adige/Südtirol provincial elections, 2008 held.
 2013 – Population: 115,540.
 2020 - Franco Ianeselli becomes mayor.

See also
 Trento history (it, de)
 , 1810–1945
 List of mayors of Trento, 1945–present
 List of bishops of Trento
 Other names of Trento
 History of Trentino province

Timelines of other cities in the macroregion of Northeast Italy:(it)
 Emilia-Romagna region: Timeline of Bologna; Ferrara; Forlì; Modena; Parma; Piacenza; Ravenna; Reggio Emilia; Rimini
 Friuli-Venezia Giulia region: Timeline of Trieste
 Veneto region: Timeline of Padua; Treviso; Venice; Verona; Vicenza

References

This article incorporates information from the Italian Wikipedia.

Bibliography

in English

in Italian

 . Memorie storiche della città e del territorio di Trento, 1821–1824
 
 . Piazze e strade di Trento, 1896
 
 
 
 Pina Pedron and Nicoletta Pontalti. Uomini e donne in guerra: Trentino, 1940–1945 (Trento: Museo Storico in Trento, 2001)

in German

External links

  (city archives)
 Archivio di Stato di Trento (state archives)
 Items related to Trento, various dates (via Europeana)
 Items related to Trento, various dates (via Digital Public Library of America)

Trento
Trento
trento